Peter Frischknecht (born 12 March 1946) is a Swiss former professional cyclo-cross cyclist. He notably won the Swiss National Cyclo-cross Championships in 1974 and 1978 in addition to 11 second-place finishes. He also won a silver medal at the UCI World Championships in 1976, 1977 and 1978. He is the father of Thomas Frischknecht and the grandfather of Andri Frischknecht, both also professional cyclists.

References

External links

1946 births
Living people
Swiss male cyclists
Cyclo-cross cyclists
People from Uster
Sportspeople from the canton of Zürich